The Beechcraft T-6 Texan II is a single-engine turboprop aircraft built by the Raytheon Aircraft Company (Textron Aviation since 2014). A trainer aircraft based on the Pilatus PC-9, the T-6 has replaced the United States Air Force's Cessna T-37B Tweet and the United States Navy's T-34C Turbo Mentor.

The T-6A is used by the United States Air Force for basic pilot training and Combat Systems Officer (CSO) training, the United States Navy and United States Marine Corps for primary Naval Aviator training and primary and intermediate Naval Flight Officer (NFO) training, and by the Royal Canadian Air Force (CT-156 Harvard II designation), Greek Air Force, Israeli Air Force (with the "Efroni" nickname), and Iraqi Air Force for basic flight training. The T-6B is the primary trainer for U.S. student naval aviators (SNAs). The T-6C is used for training by the Mexican Air Force, Royal Air Force, Royal Moroccan Air Force, and the Royal New Zealand Air Force.

Design and development
The Model 3000/T-6 is a low-wing cantilever monoplane with enclosed tandem seating for two. It is powered by single Pratt & Whitney Canada PT6A-68 turboprop engine in tractor configuration with an aluminum, four-blade, constant-speed, variable pitch, non-reversing, feathering propeller assembly and has retractable tricycle landing gear. The aircraft is fitted with Martin-Baker Mark 16 ejection seats and a canopy fracturing system.

The T-6 is a development of the Pilatus PC-9, modified by Beechcraft to enter the Joint Primary Aircraft Training System (JPATS) competition in the 1990s. A similar arrangement between Pilatus and British Aerospace had also been in place for a Royal Air Force competition in the 1980s, although that competition selected the Short Tucano. The aircraft was designated under the 1962 United States Tri-Service aircraft designation system and named for the decades-earlier T-6 Texan.

The JPATS competition-winning design was based on a commercial off-the-shelf Pilatus PC-9, with minor modifications.  Additional requirements and conflicts between the Air Force and the Navy resulted in delays, cost increases (from initial estimates of $3.9 to roughly $6 million per aircraft) and an aircraft that is 22% or  heavier than the Pilatus.

On 9 April 2007, the U.S. Department of Defense released their Selected Acquisition Reports, which reported that the T-6 JPATS program was one of only eight programs cited for Congressional notification for 25–50% cost overrun over initial estimates, which is referred to as a "Nunn-McCurdy Breach" after the Nunn-McCurdy Amendment. It is unusual for a program so far into full-rate production to experience significant enough cost overruns to trigger this congressional notification.

Operational history

United States

The T-6A was introduced to Moody Air Force Base and Randolph Air Force Base in 2000–2001, and the Air Force awarded the full-rate T-6 production contract in December 2001. Laughlin Air Force Base began flying the T-6 in 2003 where it became the primary basic trainer, replacing the T-37. Vance Air Force Base completed transitioning from the T-37 to the T-6 in 2006. That year, Columbus Air Force Base began its transition, and retired its last T-37 in April 2008. The last active USAF T-37Bs were retired at Sheppard Air Force Base in the summer of 2009.

The Texan failed to qualify for the Light Attack/Armed Reconnaissance program, because the USAF mailed the exclusion notice to the wrong address, leaving the company with no time to protest the decision. But the official mail failure gave Hawker-Beechcraft a further legal justification, as they had told the USAF they planned to file a legal challenge even before the official notice had been mailed and brought its considerable political influence to bear against the USAF decision against their candidate with one Kansas Congressman stating, "It is simply wrong for the Obama administration to hire a Brazilian company to handle national security when we have a qualified and competent American company that can do the job." In 2013, Beechcraft was once again the loser.

In August 2017, the Air Force conducted the "Light Attack Experiment" to evaluate potential light attack aircraft. Following this, it decided to continue experimenting with two non-developmental aircraft, the AT-6 Wolverine derivative of the T-6 Texan II and the Sierra Nevada/Embraer A-29 Super Tucano.  Tests were scheduled to be conducted at Davis-Monthan Air Force Base, Arizona between May and July 2018. The tests are intended "to experiment with maintenance, data networking and sensors...[to] gather the data needed for a rapid procurement", according to Secretary of the Air Force Heather Wilson. Experimentation will examine logistics requirements, weapons and sensor issues, and future interoperability with partner forces.

The Air Force expects to have the information it needs to potentially buy light attack aircraft in a future competition, without conducting a combat demonstration, based on data collected during the first round of the experiment and future data anticipated to be collected in the next phase of experimentation.

During the last week of January 2018, a cluster of unexplained physiological events involving the T-6 occurred at Columbus, Vance, and Sheppard Air Force Bases. In response, the commander of Nineteenth Air Force, which is responsible for USAF pilot training, directed an "operational pause" in Texan II operations on 1 February 2018 to ensure aircrew safety. The pause was intended to enable the Air Force to "examine the root causes of the incidents, educate and listen to aircrew, develop and deliver mitigation solutions." The Air Force had established a general officer-led team to integrate and coordinate efforts across the Air Force to address aircrew unexplained physiological events earlier in 2018.

In February 2018, the AT-6 Wolverine and the A-29 Super Tucano were named as the only two remaining aircraft in USAF's Light Attack/Armed Reconnaissance aircraft competition.

Canada
The CT-156 Harvard II is a variant used for pilot instruction in the NATO Flying Training in Canada (NFTC), located at 15 Wing, Moose Jaw, Saskatchewan. They are leased to the Royal Canadian Air Force by the program's administrator, CAE. NFTC's Harvard II aircraft are almost identical in cockpit layout and performance to the American JPATS Texan IIs. Within NFTC, students fly the Harvard II in Phase 2 and 3 of the training program, and some will go on to fly the CT-155 Hawk jet trainer also used by NFTC for Phase 4 (Moose Jaw) and Phase 5 Fighter Lead-In Training (4 Wing, Cold Lake, Alberta). NFTC had 25 Harvard II aircraft owned and maintained by Bombardier, although one was lost following a non-fatal crash in 2011. CAE took over the program in 2015.

Greece

The Hellenic Air Force operates 25 T-6A and 20 T-6A NTA aircraft.

Israel
On 9 June 2008, the Defense Security Cooperation Agency announced a possible FMS sale to Israel of 25 T-6As for the Israeli Air Force. In July 2009, Beechcraft delivered the first four of 20 T-6As under contract to the Israeli Air Force.

Iraq
On 16 December 2009, the first four of 15 T-6A aircraft were delivered to Tikrit, Iraq under a $210 million contract. No AT-6 aircraft were included as was previously reported. The last four T-6As reached Iraq on 9 November 2010.

On 13 May 2014, the US State Department approved an order for 24 T-6C aircraft for use as trainers by the Iraqi Air Force. The sale was worth US$790 million and was part of a larger one billion dollar deal.

Morocco
In October 2009, Hawker Beechcraft announced the sale of 24 T-6Cs for the Royal Moroccan Air Force.

Mexico
On 9 January 2012, Mexico purchased six T-6C+ aircraft for the Mexican Air Force to begin replacing their Pilatus PC-7 trainers. On 24 October 2013, Hawker Beechcraft announced a follow-on order of an additional six T-6C+ aircraft for the Mexican Air Force, bringing the total ordered to 12. The Mexican Navy also ordered two T-6C+ Trainers in March 2014.

New Zealand

The New Zealand Government announced the purchase of 11 T-6Cs for the Royal New Zealand Air Force for NZ$154 million, on 27 January 2014 to replace the PAC CT/4 Airtrainer, with all aircraft delivered by February 2015. The first training course using the type began early 2016. The T-6Cs are expected to remain in service with the RNZAF for 30 years.

United Kingdom
On 24 October 2014, the UK Ministry of Defence announced its preferred bidder for the UK Military Flying Training System programme. Ascent's system will involve T-6C Texan IIs in the basic trainer role for both Royal Air Force and Royal Navy pilots. The contract for ten aircraft was signed by Affinity Flying Training Services and Beechcraft Defense on 4 February 2016. The T-6C trainers have replaced Shorts Tucano T1 aircraft.

Argentina
In October 2017, the Argentine Air Force received the first four of 12 T-6C+ aircraft purchased from Textron Aviation and a further two in June 2018.

Tunisia
In October 2019, U.S. State Department approved the possible Foreign Military Sale of 12 T-6Cs to Tunisia at an estimated cost of $234 million, including related spares, ground support equipment, and support. The sale is intended to provide replacement for the aging trainer fleet of Tunisian Air Force and to train pilots for counter-terrorism and border security missions.

Variants

Model 3000
Company designation

T-6A Texan II  Standard version for the USAF, USN, and Hellenic Air Force (25).

T-6A NTA Texan II  Armed version of the T-6A for the HAF (20). T-6A NTA has the capability to carry rocket pods, gun pods, external fuel tanks, and bombs.

T-6B Texan II  Upgraded version of the T-6A with a digital glass cockpit that includes a Head-Up Display (HUD), six multi-function displays (MFD) and Hands on Throttle And Stick (HOTAS), used at Naval Air Station Whiting Field, Naval Air Station Corpus Christi, and United States Naval Test Pilot School.

AT-6B Wolverine  Initial armed version of the T-6B for primary weapons training or light attack roles. It has the same digital cockpit, but upgraded to include datalink and integrated electro-optical sensors along with several weapons configurations. Engine power is increased to 1,600 shp (1193 kW) with the Pratt & Whitney Canada PT6-68D engine, and the structure is reinforced. 

T-6C Texan II  Upgraded version of the T-6B with wing hard points, primarily designated for export sales.

T-6D Texan II  Version based on T-6B and C for the US Army for operational support, testing, utility, and chase plane roles.

AT-6E Wolverine  Production armed version of the T-6 for primary weapons training or light attack roles. Two delivered to the USAF for continued testing. In November 2021, eight were ordered by Thailand as the AT-6TH.

CT-156 Harvard II  Version of the T-6A for NFTC with the Canadian Forces. Nearly identical to standard USAF and USN in terms of avionics, cockpit layout, and performance.

Operators

 Argentine Air Force – 12 T-6C+ on order, six delivered as of June 2018.

 Royal Canadian Air Force - 24 Aircraft operated from CFB Moose Jaw, Saskatchewan
 2 Canadian Forces Flying Training School – 24 CT-156 Harvard IIs for pilot training.

 Colombian Air Force - 10 on order, six delivered as of December 2023.

 Hellenic Air Force 45 T-6A

 Iraqi Air Force

 Israeli Air Force 20 T-6A

 Mexican Air Force 6 T-6C+ delivered in 2012. A follow-on order for 6 more planes was made, due for delivery in late 2013.
 Mexican Navy

 Royal Moroccan Air Force 24 T-6Cs in service as of January 2012.

 Royal New Zealand Air Force- 11 Aircraft, operated from RNZAF Base Ohakea, Manawatu
 No. 14 Squadron- Pilot training
 Central Flying School- Qualified Flight Instructor training
 Black Falcons- Aerobatic display team

 Royal Thai Air Force 12 T-6TH. Delivery scheduled for 2022–2023.and order 8 AT-6TH Wolverine.

 Tunisian Air Force
 No. 13 Squadron
 
 Royal Air Force 
 RAF Valley, Anglesey, Wales
 No. 72 Squadron – 10 Texan T1s for Basic Fast Jet Training.

 United States Air Force
 Air Education and Training Command
 United States Army
 Redstone Arsenal, Huntsville, Alabama
 United States Navy
 Naval Air Training Command
 Naval Air Warfare Center Aircraft Division

 Vietnam People's Air Force - 12 on order. Delivery scheduled for 2024-2027.

Specifications (T-6A)

See also

References

External links

 Beechcraft T-6C Texan II official site
 
 United States Navy T-6 Texan II fact sheet 
 Royal Canadian Air Force CT-156 page
 Hawker Beechcraft T-6 comparison to PC-9

T-006 Texan II
1990s United States military trainer aircraft
Single-engined tractor aircraft
Low-wing aircraft
Single-engined turboprop aircraft
Aircraft first flown in 2000